KCMQ (96.7 FM) is a radio station broadcasting a classic rock format. Licensed to Columbia, Missouri, the station is currently owned by the Zimmer Radio Group.

KCMQ’s signal is 100 kW, being heard throughout Columbia, Lake of the Ozarks, Jefferson City, Rolla, Owensville, and even Western St. Louis and Eastern Kansas City. It is also heard on 103.1 K276DI (once used for KTGR 1580) in Columbia.

KCMQ carries Kansas City Chiefs football games.

The station has received NAB Marconi Radio Awards in multiple years for best rock radio station in the country.

Programming schedule
The current programming:
 5 am  – 10 am: The Morning Shag with Shags and Trevor
 10 am  – 2 pm: Kelly
 2 pm  – 7 pm: Tim Taylor
 7 pm – 12 am: Nights With Alice Cooper

Weekend syndicated shows include Dee Snider's House Of Hair and Flashback with Matt Pinfield.

Station history
 1967–1976: Top 40
 1976–1978: Country
 1978–1993: Top 40
 1993–1996: Country
 1996–1998: Hard rock
 1998–present: Classic rock

References

External links
KCMQ website

CMQ
Classic rock radio stations in the United States
Radio stations established in 1972
1972 establishments in Missouri